Harald Christian Strand Nilsen (born 7 May 1971) is a retired Norwegian alpine skier.

Born in Gjøvik, the all-rounder won no World Cup Races during his active career, but gained several podiums, especially in the 1994/95 season, where he ended third in the Giant Slalom World Cup behind Alberto Tomba and Jure Kosir. The 13th place in the overall Alpine skiing World Cup was to become his best classification in any year.

In the following years Strand Nilsen specialised in slalom and regularly managed to be among the top 15 in World Cup races. However, he would never quite tie in with his earlier successes of 1994 and 1995.

In the Lillehammer Winter Olympics in 1994 he won third place in the Combined event, behind his fellow countrymen Lasse Kjus and Kjetil André Aamodt.

He retired at the end of the 2002/03 season.

Strand Nilsen is today situated in his hometown Gjøvik, Norway.

References 

1971 births
Living people
Norwegian male alpine skiers
Alpine skiers at the 1994 Winter Olympics
Alpine skiers at the 1998 Winter Olympics
Olympic bronze medalists for Norway
Olympic alpine skiers of Norway
Olympic medalists in alpine skiing
Medalists at the 1994 Winter Olympics
Sportspeople from Gjøvik